Ulnar collateral ligament injuries can occur during certain activities such as overhead baseball pitching. Acute or chronic disruption and/or attenuation of the ulnar collateral ligament often result in medial elbow pain, valgus instability, neurologic deficiency, and impaired throwing performance. There are both non-surgical and surgical treatment options.

Signs and symptoms

Pain along the inside of the elbow is the main symptom of this condition. Throwing athletes report it occurs most often during the acceleration phase of throwing. Closing the hand and clenching the fist has also been shown to reproduce the painful symptoms. The injury is often associated with an experience of a sharp “pop” in the elbow, followed by pain during a single throw.  In addition, swelling and bruising of the elbow, loss of elbow range of motion, and a sudden decrease in throwing velocity are all common symptoms of a UCL injury. If the injury is less severe, pain can be minimal with complete rest.

Causes
The UCL is important because it stabilizes the elbow from being abducted. If intense or repeated bouts of valgus stress occur on the UCL, injury will most likely transpire. Damage to the ulnar collateral ligament is common among baseball pitchers and javelin throwers because the throwing motion is similar. Physicians believe repetitive movements, especially pitching in baseball, cause adolescents' UCL injuries. Furthermore, physicians have stated that if an adolescent throws over 85 throws for 8 months or more in a year, or throw when exhausted, the adolescent has a significantly higher risk of succumbing to a UCL surgery. Gridiron football, racquet sports, ice hockey and water polo players have also been treated for damage to the ulnar collateral ligament. Specific overhead movements like those that occur during baseball pitching, tennis serving or volleyball spiking increase the risk of UCL injury. During the cocking phase of pitching, the shoulder is horizontally abducted, externally rotated and the elbow is flexed. There is slight stress on the UCL in this position but it increases when the shoulder is further externally rotated. The greater the stress the more the UCL is stretched causing strain. During the overhead throwing motion, valgus stress on the medial elbow occurs during arm cocking and acceleration. The initiation of valgus stress occurs at the conclusion of the arm-cocking phase. In the transitional moment from arm cocking to arm acceleration, the shoulder vigorously rotates internally, the forearm is in near full supination, and the elbow flexes from 90° to approximately 125°. From late cocking to ball release, the elbow rapidly extends from approximately 125° to 25° at ball release. This causes tremendous valgus stress and tensile strain on the UCL. Injuries to the ulnar collateral ligament are believed to result from poor throwing mechanics, overuse, high throwing velocities, and throwing certain types of pitches, such as curveballs. Poor mechanics along with high repetition of these overhead movements can cause irritation, micro-tears or ruptures of the UCL.  Kinetic chain dysfunction due to poor lower extremity strength, core strength and stability can be associated with UCL injuries as well as capsular stiffness in glenohumeral internal rotation deficit (GIRD), and scapular dyskinesis. Injuries to the Ulnar Collateral Ligament in baseball players are rarely due to one-time, traumatic events. Rather, they are more often due to small chronic tears that accumulate over time.

Anatomy

The ulnar collateral ligament (UCL, also known as medial collateral ligament) is located on the medial side of the elbow. The UCL complex comprises three ligaments: the anterior oblique, posterior oblique and transverse ligaments. The anterior oblique ligament (AOL) attaches from the undersurface of the medial epicondyle to the medial ulnar surface slightly below the coronoid process. It is the sturdiest of the three sections within the UCL. The AOL acts as the primary restraint against valgus stress at the elbow during flexion and extension. The posterior oblique originates at the medial epicondyle and inserts along the mid-portion of the medial semilunar notch. It applies more stability against valgus stress when the elbow is flexed rather than extended. The transverse ligament connects to the inferior medial coronoid process of the ulna to the medial tip of the olecranon. Since it is connected to the same bone and not across the elbow joint, the transverse ligament has no contribution to the joint’s stability.

Diagnosis
In most cases, a physician will diagnose an ulnar collateral ligament injury using a patient’s medical history and a physical examination that includes a valgus stress test. The valgus stress test is performed on both arms and a positive test is indicated by pain on the affected arm that is not present on the uninvolved side.  Physicians often utilize imaging techniques such as ultrasound, x-rays and magnetic resonance imaging or arthroscopic surgery to aid with making a proper diagnosis.

Classification
A slow and chronic deterioration of the ulnar collateral ligament can be due to repetitive stress acting on the ulna.  At first, pain can be bearable and can worsen to an extent where it can terminate an athlete’s career.  The repetitive stress placed on the ulna causes micro tears in the ligament resulting in the loss of structural integrity over time.  The acute rupture is less common compared to the slow deterioration injury.  The acute rupture occurs in collisions when the elbow is in flexion such as that in a wrestling match or a tackle in football.  The ulnar collateral ligament distributes over fifty percent of the medial support of the elbow.  This can result in an ulnar collateral ligament injury or a dislocated elbow causing severe damage to the elbow and the radioulnar joints.

Treatments

UCL injuries may or may not require surgery.  Non surgical treatment will primarily focus on strengthening the elbow joint to regain strength and stability. First a course of 
RICE (Rest, ice, compression, elevation) is typically coupled with NSAIDS (Non-steroidal anti-inflammatory drugs) to help alleviate pain and swelling.  When the swelling has subsided, individual exercises or physical therapy may be prescribed to strengthen muscles around the elbow joint to compensate for tearing in the UCL. These may include biceps curls (non resistance and resistance), pronating and supinating the forearm, and grip strengthening exercises, performed with low resistance and moderate repetitions no more than three times a week.

Surgical treatment may help restore the ability to perform the overhand throwing motions most commonly associated with UCL injuries. The reconstructive surgery, generally known as Tommy John surgery, was first performed by Dr. Frank Jobe in 1974 and has modified several times over the past 30 years. The surgery involves an autograft of the palmaris longus tendon (mostly seen as an accessory tendon) or an allograft of tissue from a cadaver or donor.  The new tendon is attached by drilling holes in the medial epicondyle of the humerus and the sublime tubercle of the ulna and lacing the tendon through them in a figure eight. The patient may begin physical therapy shortly after. It usually takes about 15 months after the surgery for standard rehabilitation. Rehabilitation following UCL injuries or surgery should follow a sequential and progressive multi-phased approach that involves a gradual and protected return of range-of-motion (ROM). The rehab program should include proprioceptive exercises to stimulate mechanoreceptors as well as arm strengthening, emphasizing proximal scapular stabilization. Low-resistance, high-repetition programs promote an optimal return to uncompensated throwing.  Post-operative treatment is related to the restoration of normal scapulohumeral rhythm, which begins with establishing trunk stability, elbow range of motion and strength as well as balance exercises.   In study conducted by Dr. Frederick Azar, 78 Tommy John surgeries were performed and analyzed after the surgeries. Of the 78 patients, 8 of them (8.8%) reported complications. Two patients had superficial infections that resolved with oral antibiotics, two patients reported tightness of tenderness at the surgery site, and one had a superficial wound infection at the elbow incision that resolved with oral antibiotics. One patient developed postoperative ulnar nerve damage. Two patients had damages to the posteromedial part of the olecranon and required to have reoperation.

Recent studies have shown that MLB pitchers who undergo Tommy John surgery return to pitch in the MLB 83% of the time and only 3% fail to return to pitch in the MLB or the minor league.

Recently, there has been a recorded increase of Tommy John surgery. The increase is related to the false perception that the surgery improves the stability of the UCL joint. Many athletes believe in this false perception and cause them to lie about their symptoms in hopes to undergo the surgery. In order to combat these rumors, physicians are motivated to educate the public that Tommy John surgeries are only for those who have severe UCL injuries. The surgery will have an insignificant effect if the patient does not have a severe UCL injury.

The tendon chosen is then woven in a figure eight pattern through the humerus and ulna, which holes were first drilled in the bones. After surgery occurs, rehabilitation comes into place and usually takes about a year  because a tendon needs time to convert into a ligament.

Epidemiology
According to the International Classification of Diseases, 9th Revision, Clinical Modification, ICD-9-CM, in 2008 the U.S. listed the diagnosis code for UCL injury as 841.1: Sprain ulnar collateral ligament.  There were a total of 336 discharges of UCL injuries.  Within the total discharges, separated by age groups: 18- to 44-year-olds; 165 people (49.17%). 45- to 64-year-olds; 91 (27.08%). 65- to 84-year-olds, 65 (19.35%) it shows that the ulnar collateral ligament injuries were more commonly found in men than women.  There were 213 men compared to 123 women with ulnar collateral ligament injury.  Most of these injuries were also paid through private insurance (170: 50.63%) and Medicare (70: 20.85%).  The average estimated cost for the surgery also known as Tommy John surgery is $21,563.

References 

Ligaments of the upper limb
Injuries